Northern Bedford County Middle/High School (commonly NBC) is a coeducational combination public middle school and public secondary school in Loysburg, Pennsylvania, United States, serving students in grades 6–12. The school is operated by a private company under contract with the county, Northern Bedford County School District, Inc.

History
NBC became a reality in 1957 with the jointure of three high schools into one. Classes were held in the three high schools until construction of the current High School was completed on May 8, 1963 for a cost of $1.25 Million  Dollars. An addition of six classrooms, service areas and a Vocational Building/Greenhouse was completed in 1976-77.

Graduation Requirements
Students at Northern Bedford must complete 28.5 Credits of coursework, and complete a Cultamating Project as well as score "profiecent" or above on the PSSA's:

Coursework Breakdown
 English - 4.0 Credits
 Math - 3 or 4 Credits, depending or not if the student plans to attend a four-year school after or not
 Science - 3 or 4 Credits, depending or not if the student plans to attend a four-year school after or not
 Social Studies - 3 or 4 Credits, depending or not if the student plans to attend a four-year school after or not
 Arts/Humaities - 2 Credits
 Electives - 6 Credits (Including CTE Courses, which are held on-site)
 Physical Education - 2 Credits
 Health - 0.5 Credit
 Family/Consumer Science - 0.5 Credit (Grade 12)
 Graduation Project - 0.5

Career-Technology Education
The school has a Vocational Building on-site in which students can participate  in a trade:
 Agriculture
 Automotive Technology
 Building Construction
 Horticulture

Clubs
The following clubs are available at Northern Bedford:
 After 3
 Band
 Band Front
 Chess
 Chorus
 Future Business Leaders of America (FBLA)
 Fellowship of Christian Athletes (FCA)
 Future Classroom and Community Leaders of America (FCCLA)
 Future Farmers of America (FFA)
 Horticulture Club
 National Honor Society
 Press Club
 Prom Junior Class Advisors
 SADD
 Scholastic Scrimmage
 Senior Trip Class Advisors
 Ski Club
 SkillsUSA (For Automotive and Building Construction Classes)
 Sport Shooting
 Student Council
 Varsity Club
 Technology Student Association
 Yearbook

Athletics
Northern Bedford is a member of the Pennsylvania Interscholastic Athletic Association (PIAA), NBC is in District V.
 Baseball
 Basketball
 Football
 Golf
 Soccer
 Softball
 Track and Field
 Volleyball
 Wrestling

References

External links 
 Official school website

Public high schools in Pennsylvania
Schools in Bedford County, Pennsylvania
Public middle schools in Pennsylvania
1957 establishments in Pennsylvania
Educational institutions established in 1957